The 2011–12 season in Honduran Liga Nacional was divided into two tournaments (Apertura and Clausura) and determined the 59th and 60th champions in the history of the league.  It also provided two berths for the 2012–13 CONCACAF Champions League.  The Apertura tournament was played in the second half of 2011, while the Clausura was played in the first half of 2012.  A new change in the system was used for this season; unlike previous years, 6 teams qualified to the final round, matching team 3rd vs team 6th and team 4th vs team 5th, those who advanced played the semifinals against 1st and 2nd.

2011–12 teams
On 18 June 2011, Atlético Choloma obtained promotion to the 2011–12 season and replaced Hispano F.C.

 C.D. Necaxa is from Tegucigalpa but will play their home games at Choluteca.

Apertura
The Apertura tournament was scheduled to be played from August to December 2011. The regular-season fixture was announced on 21 July 2011 and as with the previous season C.D.S. Vida and Real C.D. España played the inaugural match on 6 August in La Ceiba, ending in a 1–1 draw. In round 14, C.D. Marathón defeated Real España 2–0 in the Clásico Sampedrano and ensured its participation in the final round reaching 27 points; meanwhile, Real España qualified to the postseason in Round 15, thanks to its 2–0 home victory over Atlético Choloma. On 6 November, Club Deportivo Olimpia defeated Marathón 1–0 at Estadio Tiburcio Carías Andino and became the third club to guarantee a spot in the final round. After round 17, Real España and Marathón had not only qualified to the final round but ensured their participation in the semifinals; also Vida and Deportes Savio got in the postseason after their draws against Olimpia and Real España respectively. Round 17 also defined the elimination of Atlético Choloma. And in the very last round, C.D. Necaxa became the last team to advance to the postseason by defeating Olimpia 0–1 at Tegucigalpa. C.D. Motagua, C.D. Platense and C.D. Victoria were eliminated.

Deportes Savio and Necaxa, two teams which had never qualified to a postseason before, made it to the second round. The brackets paired Olimpia (3rd) versus Necaxa (6th) and Vida (4th) versus Deportes Savio (5th). Olimpia got the ticket to the semifinals with a 2–1 victory over Necaxa; meanwhile the series between Vida and Deportes Savio was decided in a coin flipping, due to a 3–3 aggregated score; both teams were also tied in the regular season with a 2–0 home win by each side; Vida advanced after the draw performed by the league's board of directors on 27 November 2011.

Once in the semifinals, Real España got rid of Vida with a 5–1 aggregated score and played the final against Olimpia, who eliminated Marathón for the second consecutive time in a semifinal series. On 17 December 2011, Olimpia obtained its 24th league title after defeating Real España with a 3–0 aggregate score; midfielder Carlos Will Mejía was the hero of the series scoring all three goals.

Regular season

Standings

Results
 As of 19 November 2011

Final round

Second round

Olimpia vs Necaxa

 Olimpia won 2–1 on aggregate score.

Vida vs Deportes Savio

 Vida 3–3 Deportes Savio on aggregate score; Vida advanced on a coin toss.

Semifinals

Real España vs Vida

 Real España won 5–1 on aggregate score.

Marathón vs Olimpia

 Olimpia won 1–0 on aggregate score.

Final

Real España vs Olimpia

 Olimpia won 3–0 on aggregate score.

Top goalscorers
 As of 17 December 2011
 15 goals:

  Claudio Cardozo (Marathón)

 9 goals:

  Jerry Bengtson (Motagua)

 7 goals:

  Charles Córdoba (Vida)

 6 goals:

  Marco Vega (Marathón)
  Juan Mejía (Deportes Savio)
  Óscar Torlacoff (Atlético Choloma)

 5 goals:

  Franco Güity (Atlético Choloma)
  Jocimar Nascimento (Vida)
  Ney Costa (Deportes Savio)
  Roger Rojas (Olimpia)

 4 goals:

  Carlos Pavón (Real España)
  Julián Rápalo (Deportes Savio)
  Allan Lalín (Real España)
  Harrison Róches (Necaxa)
  Julio Rodríguez (Real España)
  Luis Lobo (Real España)
  Mauricio Copete (Victoria)
  Nery Medina (Necaxa)
  Carlos Mejía (Olimpia)

 3 goals:

  John Beaumont (Platense)
  Roby Norales (Motagua)
  Edder Delgado (Real España)
  Carlos Oliva (Victoria)
  Víctor Mena (Victoria)
  Francisco Pavón (Vida)
  Rommel Quioto (Vida)
  Elmer Zelaya (Victoria)

 2 goals:

  Óscar Durón (Necaxa)
  Francisco López (Atlético Choloma)
  Mario Martínez (Real España)
  Elroy Smith (Deportes Savio)
  Henry Córdoba (Platense)
  Héctor Acuña (Marathón)
  Carlos Discua (Motagua)
  Rubén Licona (Necaxa)
  Reynaldo Tilguath (Olimpia)
  Saul Martínez (Marathón)
  Óscar Bonilla (Victoria)
  Fábio Prates (Deportes Savio)
  Mario Berríos (Marathón)
  Amado Guevara (Motagua)
  Jaime Rosales (Victoria)
  Fredixon Elvir (Olimpia)
  Hilder Colón (Real España)
  Ramiro Bruschi (Olimpia)
  Marvin Sánchez (Atlético Choloma)
  Shannon Welcome (Necaxa)
  Christian Martínez (Real España)

 1 goal:

  Nahún Solís (Platense)
  Kervin Johnson (Deportes Savio)
  Daniel Tejeda (Real España)
  Diego Silva (Marathón)
  Luis Jaramillo (Victoria)
  Johnny Palacios (Olimpia)
  Ábner Méndez (Vida)
  Elvis Scott (Platense)
  Jerry Díaz (Platense)
  Pedro Fernández (Vida)
  José Tobías (Deportes Savio)
  Henry Bermúdez (Olimpia)
  Kevin Johnson (Deportes Savio)
  Junior Morales (Deportes Savio)
  Marco Mejía (Deportes Savio)
  Boniek García (Olimpia)
  Óscar Zepeda (Deportes Savio)
  Bayron Méndez (Platense)
  Ever Alvarado (Real España)
  Milton Ruiz (Victoria)
  Néstor Martínez (Olimpia)
  Jesús Navas (Necaxa)
  Érick Vallecillo (Atlético Choloma)
  Juan Raudales (Atlético Choloma)
  David Meza (Platense)
  Luis Castro (Vida)
  Carlos Morán (Motagua)
  Júnior Padilla (Motagua)
  Fábio de Souza (Olimpia)
  Edward Suazo (Platense)
  Aarón Bardales (Necaxa)
  Mariano Acevedo (Marathón)
  Wilmer Crisanto (Victoria)
  Mitchel Rivera (Platense)
  Ramón Castillo (Platense)
  Brayan Beckeles (Olimpia)
  Román Castillo (Vida)
  Jorge Claros (Motagua)
  Johnny Calderón (Real España)
  Mario Chávez (Vida)
  José Burgos (Necaxa)
  Maynor Suazo (Atlético Choloma)
  Michet Ávila (Motagua)
  Gerson Rodas (Real España)

 1 own-goal:

  Carlos Discua (Motagua)
  Víctor Mena (Victoria)
  Wilfredo Barahona (Atlético Choloma)
  Carlos Pérez (Necaxa)
  Julián Rápalo (Deportes Savio)

Clausura
The Clausura tournament started on 7 January and is set to finish in May 2012. The inauguration round started with a 2–2 drawn between C.D.S. Vida and C.D. Marathón at Estadio Nilmo Edwards and the Atlético Choloma's 2–1 home victory over C.D. Victoria. Club Deportivo Olimpia became the first team to ensure a postseason spot on 25 March in the 0–0 drawn against C.D. Motagua in the Honduran Superclásico; Marathón did it on 1 April in the 2–2 home drawn against C.D. Platense. Two weeks later, on 14 April, Motagua qualified thanks to its 0–1 away win at Marathón. Also on 14 April, C.D. Platense, was mathematically relegated to the Liga de Ascenso. One day later, Deportes Savio lost any postseason hopes, due to their 1–2 away lost at Estadio Excélsior against Platense. On 18 April, Atlético Choloma, Real C.D. España and Vida qualified to the Final round leaving Victoria and C.D. Necaxa eliminated.

All Second round clashes were determined on the very last round of the Regular phase; Atlético Choloma made history and qualified to the playoffs on their second season franchise and faced Real España, where they were eliminated after a 1–3 defeat on aggregate. Marathón had a drop in their last games performance and gave up the chance to play directly in the semifinals, they finished thirds and had to face Vida who finished fourth. In this phase, Marathón beat Vida with a tight 2–1 win on aggregate. Once in the semifinals, Olimpia had no troubles to eliminate Real España with a notorious 6–0 win on aggregate; meanwhile in the other series, Marathón surprised Motagua with a 0–2 away win at Tegucigalpa.

In the final series, Olimpia and Marathón faced each other in this instance for the 9th time. The first leg at Estadio Olímpico Metropolitano ended in a 0–0 draw, the game was mainly dominated by the home team but they were unable to score. In the second leg, Olimpia with an early second half goal by Brazilian striker Douglas Caetano captured its 25th domestic league. This title came in the year of the centenary for the White Lions.

Regular season

Standings

Results
 As of 22 April 2012

Final round

Second round

Marathón vs Vida

 Marathón won 2–1 on aggregate score.

Atlético Choloma vs Real España

 Real España won 3–1 on aggregate score.

Semifinals

Olimpia vs Real España

 Olimpia won 6–0 on aggregate score.

Motagua vs Marathón

 Marathón won 2–0 on aggregate score.

Final

Olimpia vs Marathón

 Olimpia won 1–0 on aggregate score.

Top goalscorers
 As of 20 May 2012
 9 goals:

  Óscar Torlacoff (Atlético Choloma)
  Mauricio Copete (Victoria)

 8 goals:

  Jocimar Nascimento (Deportes Savio)
  Roger Rojas (Olimpia)

 7 goals:

  Luis Ramírez (Marathón)
  Charles Córdoba (Vida)
  Juan Mejía (Olimpia)

 6 goals:

  Carlos Discua (Motagua)
  Jonathan Hansen (Real España)
  Douglas Caetano (Olimpia)

 5 goals:

  Julio Rodríguez (Real España)
  Abner Méndez (Vida)
  Romell Quioto (Vida)
  Elmer Zelaya (Victoria)

 4 goals:

  Víctor Mena (Victoria)
  Aly Arriola (Deportes Savio)
  Franco Güity (Atlético Choloma)
  Kervin Johnson (Deportes Savio)
  Marco Vega (Marathón)
  Ramiro Bruschi (Olimpia)
  Shannon Welcome (Necaxa)
  Rubén Licona (Necaxa)

 3 goals:

  Carlos Pavón (Real España)
  Mario Martínez (Real España)
  Reynaldo Tilguath (Olimpia)
  Marvin Sánchez (Atlético Choloma)
  Pastor Martínez (Marathón)
  Mitchel Brown (Marathón)
  Rigoberto Padilla (Victoria)
  Edder Delgado (Real España)

 2 goals:

  Julio de León (Motagua)
  Walter Martínez (Necaxa)
  Mariano Acevedo (Marathón)
  Jerry Bengtson (Motagua)
  Christian Martínez (Real España)
  Mitchel Rivera (Platense)
  Amado Guevara (Motagua)
  Jerry Palacios (Marathón)
  Luis Lobo (Real España)
  Nissi Sauceda (Necaxa)
  Cristopher Urmeneta (Necaxa)
  Ángel Pineda (Deportes Savio)
  Juan García (Olimpia)
  Víctor Ortiz (Victoria)
  Allan Lalín (Real España)
  Francisco López (Platense)
  Samir García (Necaxa)
  Fredixon Elvir (Olimpia)
  Fábio de Souza (Olimpia)
  Ever Alvarado (Real España)
  Boniek García (Olimpia)
  David Meza (Marathón)

 1 goal:

  Johnny Leverón (Motagua)
  Óscar Zepeda (Deportes Savio)
  Luis Castro (Vida)
  Orlin Peralta (Vida)
  Moacyr Filho (Platense)
  David Colón (Victoria)
  Óscar Morales (Vida)
  Henry Córdova (Platense)
  Roby Norales (Motagua)
  Johnny Palacios (Olimpia)
  Everaldo Ferreira (Atlético Choloma)
  Elroy Smith (Deportes Savio)
  Óscar García (Deportes Savio)
  Kevin Osorio (Necaxa)
  Junior Padilla (Motagua)
  Nahún Solís (Platense)
  Luis Arriola (Necaxa)
  Júnior Izaguirre (Motagua)
  Mario Berríos (Marathón)
  Julián Rápalo (Deportes Savio)
  Harrison Róches (Marathón)
  Mauricio Castro (Atlético Choloma)
  David Molina (Motagua)
  Jairo Crisanto (Victoria)
  Jorge Lozano (Vida)
  Mauricio Sabillón (Marathón)
  Jefry Flores (Real España)
  Eder García (Deportes Savio)
  Ian Osorio (Platense)
  Aldo Oviedo (Atlético Choloma)
  Félix Crisanto (Victoria)
  Jairo Puerto (Real España)
  Romel Murillo (Marathón)
  Ricardo Barrios (Motagua)
  Carlos Mejía (Olimpia)
  Raúl Santos (Vida)
  Bayron Méndez (Platense)
  Jorge Cardona (Platense)
  Ney Costa (Vida)
  Francisco Pavón (Vida)
  Francisco Díaz (Platense)
  Jerry Díaz (Platense)
  Abidán Solís (Atlético Choloma)
  Elder Valladares (Atlético Choloma)
  Alexander Aguilar (Marathón)
  Ronald Martínez (Motagua)
  José Tobías (Deportes Savio)
  Jesús Navas (Necaxa)
  Rony Morales (Platense)
  Sergio Mendoza (Motagua)
  José Casildo (Platense)
  Carlos Solórzano (Vida)
  Georgie Welcome (Motagua)
  Luis Jaramillo (Victoria)
  Marco Mejía (Deportes Savio)

 1 own goal:

  Maynor Martínez (Real España)
  Jorge Lozano (Vida)
  Johny Galdámez (Deportes Savio)
  Henry Acosta (Real España)
  Ian Osorio (Platense)
  Wilmer Crisanto (Victoria)
  Juan Montes (Necaxa)

Aggregate table
Relegation was determined by the aggregated table of both Apertura and Clausura tournaments. On 14 April, C.D. Platense became officially relegated to the second division, it is the first relegation for the Escualos since the 1981–82 season; however, on 25 May 2012, Platense bought C.D. Necaxa's franchise for L. 4.5 million and will play in the first division for the 2012–13 season.

References

External links
 Official website - LINA.hn
 Football scores for Honduran Liga Nacional

Liga Nacional de Fútbol Profesional de Honduras seasons
1
Honduras